Richard Healey (born February 22, 1959) is an American luger from Somerville, New Jersey. He came 11th in the men's doubles event at the 1980 Winter Olympics.

He received his degree from North Dakota State University. Healey competed in luge from 1977-80. He finished sixth at the 1979 North American Championships.

References

External links
 

1959 births
Living people
American male lugers
Olympic lugers of the United States
Lugers at the 1980 Winter Olympics
Sportspeople from Somerville, New Jersey